The family tree of the Castilian monarchs of the Kingdom of Castile (1065–1230),  in the historical region of Castile in Spain.

Key
The colors denotes the monarchs from the:
 - House of Jiménez;  - House of Burgundy;  - House of Trastámara

——  The solid lines denotes the legitimate descents

– – – - The dashed lines denotes a marriage

· · · · The dotted lines denotes the liaisons and illegitimate descents

Family tree

See also
 
 List of Castilian monarchs

External links

.
Castile
Kingdom of Castile